Dillsburg is a borough in York County, Pennsylvania, United States. The population was 2,643 as of the 2020 census.

Geography
Dillsburg is surrounded by Carroll Township in northwestern York County.

History 
The town is named for Matthew Dill, an immigrant from County Monaghan, Ireland, who settled the town in 1740. The village became a center for local agriculture.

During the Civil War's Gettysburg Campaign, Dillsburg was twice invaded by Confederate cavalry, first by Albert G. Jenkins's brigade, then by Maj. Gen. J.E.B. Stuart's division.

Dill's Tavern, founded in the 1750s with a current building constructed between 1794 and 1819, and the Rev. Anderson B. Quay House are listed on the National Register of Historic Places.

Demographics

As of the census of 2000, there were 2,063 people, 902 households, and 579 families living in the borough. The population density was 2,600.7 people per square mile (1,008.3/km2). There were 936 housing units at an average density of 1,180.0 per square mile (457.5/km2). The racial makeup of the borough was 97.19% White, 0.48% African American, 0.44% Native American, 1.21% Asian, and 0.68% from two or more races. Hispanic or Latino of any race were 0.29% of the population.

There were 902 households, out of which 30.3% had children under the age of 18 living with them, 50.1% were married couples living together, 10.8% had a female householder with no husband present, and 35.7% were non-families. 31.8% of all households were made up of individuals, and 14.7% had someone living alone who was 65 years of age or older. The average household size was 2.29 and the average family size was 2.89.

In the borough, the population was spread out, with 24.6% under the age of 18, 7.6% from 18 to 24, 31.2% from 25 to 44, 22.2% from 45 to 64, and 14.5% who were 65 years of age or older. The median age was 37 years. For every 100 females there were 87.2 males. For every 100 females age 18 and over, there were 81.2 males.

The median income for a household in the borough was $37,530, and the median income for a family was $46,797. Males had a median income of $42,235 versus $21,995 for females. The per capita income for the borough was $19,801. About 7.5% of families and 6.3% of the population were below the poverty line, including 9.6% of those under age 18 and 6.4% of those age 65 or over.

Town festivals
Dillsburg's Farmers Fair celebration is held annually during the third weekend in October.  Among the many attractions are the parades on Friday and Saturday evenings, the classic car and farm tractor parade Saturday afternoon, and Civil War reenactments at the nearby Dill's Tavern.  A wide variety of food can be found, from common concessions to specialty theme items such as fried pickles and pickle soup.

Dillsburg drops a larger-than-life pickle on New Year's Eve in an event called the "Pickle Drop".

District schools
 Northern York County School District
 Dillsburg Elementary School
 Northern Elementary School
 South Mountain Elementary School
 Wellsville Elementary School
 Northern Middle School
 Northern High School

Notable people
David A. Day (1851-1897), Lutheran missionary
Daniel J. Dill (1830-1917), Wisconsin State Assemblyman
Danny DiPrima (born 1991), Professional soccer player
Cody Eppley (born 1985), Professional baseball player
Dawn Keefer (born 1972), Member of the Pennsylvania House of Representatives
Chris Kilmore (born 1973), Keyboardist for the rock band Incubus
Henry Logan (1784-1866), Member of the U.S. House of Representatives from Pennsylvania
Matthew Quay (1833-1904), U.S. Senator from Pennsylvania

References

External links

 Borough of Dillsburg official website

Populated places established in 1740
Boroughs in York County, Pennsylvania
1740 establishments in Pennsylvania
1833 establishments in Pennsylvania